The Dacia Manifesto is an all-wheel drive electric buggy concept with high ground clearance, officially presented by Dacia on September 16, 2022.

Before that, the concept was briefly shown on September 14, 2022 in a teaser published by Dacia Romania on their Facebook page. It will also be present at the 2022 Paris Motor Show alongside the rest of the refreshed range.

Overview
The model bears the brand's new emblem, which is here illuminated. The body is made from a recycled plastic called Starkle and has no doors, side windows or windshield. The vehicle, including the interior, are 100% waterproof. The concept will not become a production model and, as the representatives of the company say, it is a "laboratory for the implementation of the newest ideas".

References

Manifesto
Concept cars
Manifesto